Patrícia Isabel Sousa Barros Morais (born 17 June 1992) is a Portuguese football goalkeeper.

References

External links 
 
 

1992 births
Living people
Portuguese women's footballers
Portugal women's international footballers
Portuguese expatriate sportspeople in France
Footballers from Lisbon
Expatriate women's footballers in France
ASPTT Albi players
Women's association football goalkeepers
Campeonato Nacional de Futebol Feminino players
S.U. 1º Dezembro (women) players
Sporting CP (women's football) players
UEFA Women's Euro 2022 players
S.C. Braga (women's football) players
UEFA Women's Euro 2017 players